The Electravia GMPE 102 is a French electric motor for powering electric aircraft, designed and produced by Electravia of Vaumeilh.

By April 2018 the engine was no longer advertised on the company website and seems to be out of production.

Design and development
The GMPE 102 is a brushed 74 volt design producing , with a disk collector. It has a 93% efficiency. The low working rpm of the engine means that it can turn a propeller at efficient speeds without the need for a reduction drive.

Specifications (GMPE 102)

See also

References

Aircraft electric engines